Muhammad Ahmad (1844–1885), otherwise known as the Mahdi, was a religious figure in Sudan.

Mohamed or Muhammad Ahmed, or any variant thereof, may also refer to:

 Mohamed Ahmed (Comorian politician) (1917–1984), Comorian politician
 Muhammad Ahmad (Nigerian politician) (died 2021), Nigerian politician
 Mohamed Jameel Ahmed (born 1969), Maldivian lawyer and politician
 Mohamed Taieb Ahmed (born 1975), Spanish-Moroccan drug lord
 Muhammad Akhlaq Ahmed (1971–2016), Pakistani field hockey player
 Mohammed Ahmed (cricketer) (born 1989), Indian cricketer
 Muhammad Ahmed (footballer, born 1988), Pakistani footballer who has played for the Pakistan national team
 Mohamed Ahmed (Emirati footballer) (born 1989), Emirati footballer
 Mohamed Ahmed (footballer, born 1998), Egyptian footballer
 Beso (footballer) (born 1999), Egyptian footballer, real name Mohamed Ahmed
 Mohammed Ahmad (footballer, born 1992), Emirati footballer
 Muhammad Ahmed (footballer, born 1991), Pakistani footballer playing currently for KRL FC
 Mohammed Ahmed (runner) (born 1991), Canadian long-distance runner
Mohamed Ering (Mohamed Ahmed Saeed Ahmed El Fadul, born 1997), Sudanese footballer
Mohamed Mustafa (Mohamed Mustafa Mohamed Ahmed, born 1996), Sudanese footballer
 Mohammed Polo (born 1956), Ghanaian footballer
 Mohammed Nasser Ahmed (born 1950), Yemeni major general and defense minister
 Muhammad Ahmed (swimmer) (born 1976), retired Iraqi swimmer
 Muhammad Isa Ahmad (born 1998), Bruneian swimmer
 Mohamed Ben Ahmed, Tunisian educator

See also
Ahmed Mohammed (disambiguation)